The 1913 Wimbledon Championships took place on the outdoor grass courts at the All England Lawn Tennis and Croquet Club in Wimbledon, London, United Kingdom. The tournament ran from 23 June until 4 July. It was the 37th staging of the Wimbledon Championships, and the first Grand Slam tennis event of 1913.

The 1913 Wimbledon Championships for the first time included a Women's Doubles and Mixed Doubles competition. The men's entry consisted of 116 competitors.

Champions

Men's singles

 Anthony Wilding defeated  Maurice McLoughlin, 8–6, 6–3, 10–8

Women's singles

 Dorothea Lambert Chambers defeated  Winifred McNair, 6–0, 6–4

Men's doubles

 Herbert Roper Barrett /  Charles Dixon defeated  Heinrich Kleinschroth /  Friedrich Rahe, 6–2, 6–4, 4–6, 6–2

Women's doubles

 Dora Boothby /  Winifred McNair defeated  Dorothea Lambert Chambers /  Charlotte Sterry, 4–6, 2–4 retired

Mixed doubles

 Hope Crisp /  Agnes Tuckey defeated  James Cecil Parke /  Ethel Larcombe, 3–6, 5–3 retired

References

External links
 Official Wimbledon Championships website

 
Wimbledon Championships
Wimbledon Championships
Wimbledon Championships
Wimbledon Championships